Bichursky District (Beshüürei aimag) is an administrative and municipal district (raion), one of the twenty-one in the Republic of Buryatia, Russia. It is located in the south of the republic. Its administrative center is the rural locality (a selo) of Bichura. As of the 2010 Census, the total population of the district was 25,352, with the population of Bichura accounting for 36.1% of that number.

History
The district was established on February 11, 1935.

Administrative and municipal status
Within the framework of administrative divisions, Bichursky District is one of the twenty-one in the Republic of Buryatia. The district is divided into thirteen selsoviets and five somons, which comprise thirty-six rural localities. As a municipal division, the district is incorporated as Bichursky Municipal District. Its thirteen selsoviets and five somons are incorporated as seventeen rural settlements within the municipal district. The selo of Bichura serves as the administrative center of both the administrative and municipal district.

References

Notes

Sources

Districts of Buryatia
States and territories established in 1935